Phtheochroa rectangulana is a species of moth of the family Tortricidae. It is found on Malta and in Spain, Algeria and Tunisia.

The wingspan is 13–17 mm. Adults have been recorded on wing in October.

References

Moths described in 1915
Phtheochroa